Dean Sutherland Prentice (October 5, 1932 – November 2, 2019) was a Canadian professional ice hockey left winger who played in the National Hockey League (NHL) for 22 seasons between 1952–53 and 1973–74. He had 10 NHL seasons with 20 or more goals. Over his NHL career, Prentice played for the New York Rangers, Boston Bruins, Detroit Red Wings, Pittsburgh Penguins, and Minnesota North Stars.

Early life
Prentice helped the Guelph Biltmore Mad Hatters win the 1952 Memorial Cup. At the time the Mad Hatters were the New York Rangers' farm team, and Prentice made the jump to the parent club the following season.

Playing career
In the 1950s, Prentice, while on the NY Rangers, skated on a line with Andy Bathgate and Larry Popein. Prentice was 10th in the league with 358 points (163 goals)from 1955-56 through 1961-62.

On February 4, 1963, Prentice was traded to the Bruins for Don McKenney and Dick Meissner.

On December 27, 1964, in Chicago Stadium, Prentice, while playing for the Bruins, was hauled down on a breakaway by Stan Mikita. Initially knocked unconscious, Prentice came to and took the awarded penalty shot, scoring on Blackhawks' goaltender Denis DeJordy. Back on the bench, Prentice was unable to leave the bench for his next shift when his back and legs locked up. After being stretchered off and undergoing x-rays, it was revealed that Prentice had scored with a broken back.

After the Rangers and Bruins failed to make the playoffs each season Prentice was there, he finally appeared in the Stanley Cup playoffs after a trade in 1966 sent him to Detroit. In his first season with Detroit, the Red Wings won the first two games of the 1966 Stanley Cup Final, before losing four straight. But it was Prentice who put up 10 points in 12 games during the Red Wings 1966 playoff run.

The Penguins claimed Prentice from Detroit in the 1969 Intra League Draft.

In the 1970 NHL All-Star Game in St. Louis, Prentice scored the only goal for the West Division team in their 4-1 loss to the East Division.  He was 37 years old at the time.

In October 1971 Prentice was traded from Pittsburgh to Minnesota for cash.

Prentice played 1378 career NHL games, scoring 391 goals and 469 assists for 860 points.

In 1976, Prentice staged a comeback of sorts, coming out of retirement at 44 years old by suiting up for the Traverse City Bays of the United States Hockey League for 28 games.

Coaching career
In 1974-75, he became the head coach of the AHL's New Haven Nighthawks. In 1976-77, he became a player-coach of the Traverse City Bays of the USHL.

From 1980-82, Prentice served as an assistant coach with the University of Guelph.

Personal life
Prentice and his wife June had two daughters, Kelly and Kerry.

His brother, Eric, played five games for the Toronto Maple Leafs during the 1943–44 NHL season. Former Alberta premier Jim Prentice is Dean's nephew (and Eric's son). Prentice died on November 2, 2019 at the age of 87. Grandsons Phil and Dan Brewer were also hockey players, with Phil reaching the ECHL and AHL level.

Following his career, Prentice moved back to Ontario in 1977 and became Ayr's director of recreation.

Legacy
In the 2009 book 100 Ranger Greats, the authors ranked Prentice at No. 37 all-time of the 901 New York Rangers who had played during the team's first 82 seasons.

Career statistics

Awards
Prentice was named to the NHL Second All-Star Team in 1960 after finishing with NHL career highs in goals (32) and points (66). He appeared the NHL All-Star Game five times (1957, 1961, 1963, 1970), the final time in 1970 at age 37.

See also
List of NHL players with 1000 games played

References

External links

1932 births
2019 deaths
Boston Bruins players
Canadian ice hockey left wingers
Detroit Red Wings players
Guelph Biltmore Mad Hatters players
Ice hockey people from Ontario
Minnesota North Stars players
New York Rangers players
Pittsburgh Penguins players
Sportspeople from Timmins